Jasenica may refer to several places:

Bosnia and Herzegovina 
 Jasenica (Bosanska Krupa), a village in the Bosanska Krupa municipality
 Jasenica, Čapljina, a village in the Čapljina municipality
 Jasenica (Gradačac), a village in the Gradačac municipality
 Jasenica, Mostar, a village in the Mostar municipality
 Jasenica (Srebrenik), a village in the Srebrenik municipality
 , a village in the Zvornik municipality
 Jasenica (Neretva), a river in the Neretva valley

Slovakia 
 Jasenica (village), a village and municipality

Serbia 
 Jasenica (river), a tributary of the Great Morava
 Jasenica (region)
 Jasenica, Negotin, a village in the Negotin municipality
 Jasenica (Valjevo), a village in the Valjevo municipality
 Jasenica (Žitorađa), a village in the Žitorađa municipality